Kaduna Airport  is an airport serving Kaduna, the capital of Kaduna State in Nigeria. The airport opened in 1982.

Kaduna also has an older airport located on the northern edge of the city.

The airport was attacked by bandits on March 26, 2022, killing a security guard.

Airlines and destinations

Statistics

Accidents and incidents
 Nigeria Airways Flight 357 (1995) took place at the airport.
 On 20 August 2010, Chanchangi Airlines Flight 334, operated by Boeing 737-200 5N-BIF struck the localizer antenna and landed short of the runway. Several passengers were slightly injured and the aircraft was substantially damaged. Chanchangi Airlines again suspended operations following the accident.

See also
Transport in Nigeria
List of airports in Nigeria

References

External links

FAAN - Kaduna facilities
OurAirports - Kaduna
SkyVector - Kaduna

Airports in Nigeria
Kaduna